Jordan Ladon Sheffield (born June 1, 1995) is an American professional baseball pitcher who is a free agent. He played college baseball at Vanderbilt University and has played in Major League Baseball (MLB) for the Colorado Rockies.

Career

Amateur career
Sheffield attended Tullahoma High School in Tullahoma, Tennessee. Before graduating, it was discovered that he needed Tommy John surgery, which caused him to fall in the Major League Baseball draft. He was selected by the Boston Red Sox in the 13th round of the 2013 Major League Baseball draft, but did not sign and chose to attend Vanderbilt University. After sitting out the 2014 season recovering from surgery, Sheffield made 6 starts and 16 relief appearances for Vanderbilt in 2015. In 60 total innings, he would post a 5–2 win–loss record, 2.85 earned run average (ERA), and 55 strikeouts. After the 2015 season, he played collegiate summer baseball with the Brewster Whitecaps of the Cape Cod Baseball League. Sheffield made 16 starts in the 2016 season, and pitched to an 8–6 record, 3.01 ERA, and 113 strikeouts in  innings.

Los Angeles Dodgers
Heading into the 2016 Major League Baseball draft, Sheffield was ranked as one of the top available players by MLB and he was drafted by the Los Angeles Dodgers in the first round (36th pick). He announced on June 25 that he had signed with the Dodgers. Sheffield made one start for the rookie-class Arizona League Dodgers and seven for the Class-A Great Lakes Loons. He was 0–1 with a 3.75 ERA in 12 innings.

Sheffield returned to Great Lakes to start the 2017 season, where he made 20 starts and was 3–7 with a 5.04 ERA. He was promoted to the Rancho Cucamonga Quakes of the California League at the end of the season, where he made four starts (and one relief appearance) and was 0–2 with an 8.00 ERA. He returned to the Quakes for the 2018 season, pitching to a 1–3 record with a 6.88 ERA in 14 games (seven starts). While playing for the Glendale Desert Dogs after the season, he was selected to the Arizona Fall League Fall Stars game.

Sheffield returned to Rancho Cucamonga to begin 2019 before being promoted to the Tulsa Drillers during the season. Between the two levels, he pitched in 49 games with a 4–5 record and 3.27 ERA with 13 saves. Sheffield did not play in a game in 2020 due to the cancellation of the minor league season because of the COVID-19 pandemic.

Colorado Rockies
Sheffield was selected by the Colorado Rockies in the 2020 Rule 5 Draft. Sheffield made the Rockies' 2021 Opening Day roster. On April 2, 2021, Sheffield made his MLB debut in relief against the Los Angeles Dodgers, pitching a scoreless 9th inning. On June 20, he was placed on the 60-day injured list with a right lat strain. He ended the season with a 3.38 ERA in 30 games. On August 12, 2022, Sheffield was designated for assignment. He was released on October 27, 2022.

Personal life
His brother, Justus, is also a major league pitcher.

See also
Rule 5 draft results

References

External links

Vanderbilt Commodores bio

1995 births
Living people
African-American baseball players
Arizona League Dodgers players
Baseball players from Tennessee
Brewster Whitecaps players
Colorado Rockies players
Glendale Desert Dogs players
Great Lakes Loons players
Major League Baseball pitchers
People from Tullahoma, Tennessee
Rancho Cucamonga Quakes players
Tulsa Drillers players
Vanderbilt Commodores baseball players